The Last Waltz (German: Der letzte Walzer) is a 1927 German silent romance film directed by Arthur Robison and starring Liane Haid, Willy Fritsch and Suzy Vernon. It was based on the 1920 operetta Der letzte Walzer by Oscar Straus.

Cast
 Liane Haid as Prinzessin Elena 
 Willy Fritsch as Graf Dimitri Sarrasow, Hauptmann 
 Suzy Vernon as Gräfin Vera 
 Fritz Rasp as Linnsky, Hofmarschall 
 Hans Adalbert Schlettow as Kronprinz Alexis 
 Sophie Pagay as Die Königin 
 Ida Wüst as Eine Hofdame 
 Elsie Vanya as Das Stubenmädchen 
 Fritz Eckert   
 John Loder

See also
 The Last Waltz (1934)
 The Last Waltz (UK, 1936)
 The Last Waltz (France, 1936)
 The Last Waltz (1953)

Bibliography
 Bergfelder, Tim & Bock, Hans-Michael. ''The Concise Cinegraph: Encyclopedia of German. Berghahn Books, 2009.

External links

1927 films
1920s romance films
German romance films
Films of the Weimar Republic
German silent feature films
Films directed by Arthur Robison
Films based on operettas
Films set in Europe
UFA GmbH films
German black-and-white films
1920s German films